Barry John Bridges (born 29 April 1941) is an English former professional footballer who played as a forward in the Football League for Chelsea, Birmingham City, Queens Park Rangers, Millwall and Brighton & Hove Albion and was capped four times for England.

Career
Bridges was signed by Chelsea in July 1956 having been spotted whilst playing for Norwich and Norfolk Boys. He turned professional in May 1958, made his debut for the club against West Ham United in February 1959, and scored in a 3–2 victory. He first established himself in the Chelsea side during the 1961–62 season, and though the club were relegated, he nevertheless proved himself a prolific goalscorer as he found the net 20 times that season.

A prolific and versatile forward who could play in the centre or on the wing, Bridges was an important part of manager Tommy Docherty's re-structured Chelsea attack, alongside Bobby Tambling and Terry Venables. He helped the club gain promotion back to the First Division at the first attempt, and then challenge for the major honours. His most successful season with the club was in 1964–65, in which he scored 27 goals in 42 matches, as Chelsea won the League Cup but faltered late-on in their championship and FA Cup challenges.

It was during that season that Bridges, along with several other players, was punished by Docherty for breaking a curfew, after which the manager's relationship with his players deteriorated. Following one more season with Chelsea, Bridges was sold to Second Division club Birmingham City in May 1966 for a club-record £55,000. He continued his impressive scoring record at St Andrew's, netting 47 times in just over 100 games, and helped the side reach the League Cup semi-finals in 1967 and the FA Cup semi-finals a year later. Following the latter defeat, he moved to Queens Park Rangers and then had spells at Millwall, Brighton & Hove Albion and Highlands Park in South Africa. He retired having scored over 200 career goals.

He won four caps for the England national team, all in 1965, and scored his only goal in a 1–1 draw with Yugoslavia. Bridges was in the preliminary squad of forty players selected by Alf Ramsey for the 1966 World Cup, but failed to make the final team.

He later moved into management, first in Ireland as player-manager of St Patrick's Athletic in May 1976 until he resigned in February 1978. While at Richmond Park he brought Gordon Banks into the team for one match.

He was also player-manager at Sligo Rovers. He then returned to his native Norfolk to manage Dereham Town, King's Lynn and Horsford United.

Career statistics

References

External links

1941 births
Living people
Sportspeople from Norfolk
English footballers
England international footballers
Association football forwards
Association football wingers
Chelsea F.C. players
Birmingham City F.C. players
Queens Park Rangers F.C. players
Millwall F.C. players
Brighton & Hove Albion F.C. players
Highlands Park F.C. players
St Patrick's Athletic F.C. players
Sligo Rovers F.C. players
English Football League players
League of Ireland players
English Football League representative players
English football managers
St Patrick's Athletic F.C. managers
Sligo Rovers F.C. managers
King's Lynn F.C. managers
Dereham Town F.C. managers
League of Ireland managers
People from Horsford
Expatriate association footballers in the Republic of Ireland